{{DISPLAYTITLE:C3H2F4}}
The molecular formula C3H2F4 (molar mass: 114.04 g/mol, exact mass: 114.0093 u) may refer to:

 1,3,3,3-Tetrafluoropropene (HFO-1234ze)
 2,3,3,3-Tetrafluoropropene (HFO-1234yf)